The Smurfs is a video game published by Ubisoft exclusively for the Nintendo DS and Nintendo 3DS, coinciding with the release of the movie of the same name.

A sequel titled The Smurfs 2 was released in 2013 for the Nintendo DS to coincide with the movie of the same name. Unlike its predecessor, the game was released for more platforms than just the DS.

Gameplay
The Smurfs lets players play a series of educational mini-games and read-along stories about the Smurfs. Players will help the Smurfs prepare for the Blue Moon festival in their village, some activities included are decorating cakes, composing a symphony and picking out an outfit for Smurfette. But, the evil wizard Gargamel is waiting to disrupt the party.

Characters
 Papa Smurf
 Baker Smurf
 Clumsy Smurf
 Smurfette
 Gargamel

References

Nintendo DS games
Nintendo DS-only games
The Smurfs video games
Ubisoft games
Video games based on films
Video games developed in Japan
2011 video games
Sony Pictures video games
Party video games